Cynodontinae is a subfamily of tropical and subtropical South American fishes of the family Cynodontidae. They are characterized by an oblique mouth and very long distinct canines, which are used to capture and stab their prey, other fish that can be up to half the length of the cynodontine itself. They are not prized as food fish, but are important in subsistence and commercial fisheries. Hydrolycus are game fish, having been recently added to the International Game Fish Association in the fly and rod class. Cynodontid fish are also sometimes housed in aquaria.

Taxonomy
This monophyletic subfamily contains only a few species: three species of Cynodon, four speciecs of Hydrolycus, and one species in the monotypic genus Rhaphiodon, Rhaphiodon vulpinus. These fish have been previously classified within Characidae.

Rhaphiodon and Cynodon are sister groups to each other; these two genera together have a sister group relationship to the genus Hydrolycus.

Distribution and habitat
Cynodontinae species are found throughout the Orinoco and Amazon basins, as well as the rivers of the Guianas. Of the cynodontines, R. vulpinus has the greatest distribution, including the Paraná-Paraguay River and Uruguay River basins. Fossil teeth have been found in the Magdalena River basin and Salta, Argentina, where cynodontines are not currently found.

These fish live in mid- to surface-water levels in rivers, flooded forests, and lakes.

Appearance and anatomy
Cynodontines are distinguished by their oblique mouth and highly developed pair of dentary canine teeth. These fish can get relatively large; Hydrolycus species can reach .

Species
Hydrolycus species here are ordered based on their relationships from the most basal to the most apomorphic based on sister group relationships when possible. Descriptions and dates based on ITIS.

Rhaphiodon Agassiz in Spix and Agassiz, 1829 
Rhaphiodon vulpinus Agassiz in Spix and Agassiz, 1829 
Cynodon Agassiz, 1829 
Cynodon gibbus (Agassiz, 1829) 
Cynodon meionactis Géry, Le Bail and Keith, 1999
Cynodon septenarius Toledo-Piza, 2000
Hydrolycus Müller and Troschel, 1844 
Hydrolycus wallacei Toledo-Piza, Menezes and dos Santos, 1999 
Hydrolycus scomberoides (Cuvier, 1819) 
Hydrolycus armatus (Jardine and Schomburgk in Schomburgk, 1841) 
Hydrolycus tatauaia Toledo-Piza, Menezes and dos Santos, 1999

References

Cynodontidae
Fish of South America
Fish subfamilies